Parachnopeziza is a genus of fungi within the Hyaloscyphaceae family. The genus contains 8 species.

References

External links
Parachnopeziza at Index Fungorum

Hyaloscyphaceae